The 1923 Denver Pioneers football team was an American football team that represented the University of Denver as a member of the Rocky Mountain Conference (RMC) during the 1923 college football season. In their first season under head coach Elmer McDevitt, the Pioneers compiled a 6–3 record (4–3 against conference opponents), finished fifth in the RMC, and outscored opponents by a total of 117 to 99.

Schedule

References

Denver
Denver Pioneers football seasons
Denver Pioneers football